Leland Morgan is an American politician from Vermont. He is a Republican member of the Vermont House of Representatives.

Career 
In the November 3, 2020 general election, unofficial reported totals showed Mitzi Johnson losing her seat in the two-member Grand Isle-Chittenden district, with Republican incumbent Leland Morgan winning 2,768 votes, his nephew and fellow Republican Michael Morgan winning 2,619 votes, and Johnson trailing with 2,601. Johnson requested a recount, which affirmed Michael Morgan's victory by a 20 vote (2,627 - 2,601) margin.

References 

Living people
Year of birth missing (living people)
Republican Party members of the Vermont House of Representatives